Peter Alan Tyler is a fictional character in the British science fiction television series Doctor Who, played by Shaun Dingwall. He is the father of the Doctor's companion Rose Tyler (Billie Piper) and first appears in the episode "Father's Day". Writer Paul Cornell incorporated characteristics of his own father whilst writing Pete. This episode reveals that Pete died during Rose's childhood; though she attempts to change her past both she and Pete eventually realise that for the good of humanity he has to die. Rose later takes inspiration from her father in a time of need.

Though deceased in Rose's universe, the 2006 series introduces a parallel universe version of Pete who, unlike the original, is rich and successful. Whilst fighting the emotionless Cybermen, Pete loses his wife, the parallel universe Jackie Tyler (Camille Coduri), and in turn struggles to comprehend that Rose is his daughter in another universe. This version of Pete returns in the finale episode in which he is there to aid his parallel self's family, eventually returning to the parallel universe with them. He settles down with the original Pete's Jackie and accepts Rose as a surrogate daughter.

Appearances
The 2005 episode "Father's Day" in which the character is introduced also establishes the background of Pete; he was born on 15 September 1954 and died on 7 November 1987 when Rose was an infant, after being struck and killed in a hit-and-run. Flashback sequences are shown in which Pete's widow, Jackie (Camille Coduri) tells Rose as a young child (Julia Joyce) that he was a good husband and father and that he died alone. In the present day, Rose asks the Ninth Doctor (Christopher Eccleston) to take her back in time in his time machine so that she can witness his death and comfort him. When faced with the reality of what she is seeing, Rose impulsively rushes forward and saves Pete from being run down, changing history and causing a temporal paradox. Resultingly, the destructive Reapers arrive and begin to "sterilise" the wound in time by eradicating everything in sight. Eventually, Pete realises that Rose is his daughter and that her tales of her childhood with him were all lies to cover up the fact he was meant to be dead. Pete chooses to sacrifice himself by deliberately stepping in front of the car that should have killed him thus saving those taken by the Reapers and restoring history. This time, Rose holds his hand whilst he dies so that he does not die alone. Rose invokes her experience of meeting Pete and being there as he died in order to secure Jackie's help in the first series finalé "The Parting of the Ways".

A parallel Earth version of Pete (played again by Dingwall) appears in three episodes of the second series (2006). In this universe, Pete is still alive, and has become rich through his entrepreneurial efforts. However, despite a public front he and Jackie have been effectively separated and have not had children, with Rose instead being the name Jackie has bestowed upon her Yorkshire terrier. Attending Jackie's 40th birthday party, Pete witnesses the first assault of the Cybermen. Though suspected by the Preachers to be one of John Lumic's (Roger Lloyd-Pack) minions, Pete reveals that he is in fact a mole who has been secretly broadcasting information about Lumic's dealings on an encrypted channel. Along with Rose, who had decided to meet her parallel parents after arriving in the parallel universe, he agrees to infiltrate the Cyber-factory and is horrified to discover that Jackie had been converted into a Cyberman. In the episode's epilogue, Rose tries to tell Pete about her origins, but he is unable to handle this information and slips away to deal with the aftermath of the Cyberman invasion. In the series finale, "Doomsday",  Pete along with Mickey Smith (Noel Clarke) and Jake Simmonds (Andrew Hayden Smith) is able to travel to the Doctor's universe to help defeat the Cybermen. During the encounter, he is introduced to Rose's universe's Jackie and realises he still has feelings for her. When the walls between universes are sealed Pete and Jackie are sent to the parallel universe for safety; he later returns to rescue Rose from falling into the breach. In the episode's epilogue, it is stated that Jackie is pregnant with his child. Pete does not return with his on screen family in the series four finalé but it is mentioned that he had been looking after his and Jackie's son, Tony.

Development

Simon Pegg, who ultimately played the Editor in "The Long Game", was reported as being in line to play Pete, before having to pass on the episode. Paul Cornell, who wrote the episode "Father's Day" states that he based the character of Pete on his own father, who attempted many different jobs one of which was, like Pete, selling health drinks. In the episode after assuming responsibility for the destructive time paradox, Pete assures Rose "I'm your dad, it's my job for it to be my fault". This line was taken from something Cornell's father once said to him. An item of discussion between the production staff was over who would rescue Rose from falling into the void in second series finale "Doomsday"; executive producer's Russell T Davies and Julie Gardner wanted Pete to rescue her, while Noel Clarke and Phil Collinson wanted Mickey. The role was ultimately given to Pete, to emphasise that he had accepted Rose as a surrogate daughter.

Reception

SFX magazine felt Shaun Dingwall to be the "lynchpin" of the episode "Father's Day" and opined that "he gives one of the series' best performances." The magazine felt that "it was inevitable that Rose's sanitised image of her dad would turn out to be far from the truth" but commended the production team "for not making him as much of a shit as they could have done." Despite his flaws, SFX concluded that Pete was "still immensely likeable." Mark Braxton of the Radio Times also praised Dingwall's "unbelievably good" performance and stated that this helped distance Pete from being "a cut-price Del Boy". In his book Who is the Doctor, Graeme Burk reacted negatively toward Pete in "Rise of the Cybermen"/"The Age of Steel", feeling that the writers had "jettisoned all the subtlety that made us love him in 'Father's Day'".

References

Television characters introduced in 2005
Recurring characters in Doctor Who
Fictional people from London
Fictional salespeople
Male characters in television